Kuzma Romanovich Sinilov (May 14, 1902 – December 27, 1957) was a Soviet Lieutenant general. He served as the military commandant of Moscow between 1941 and 1953.

Early life and career 
Sinilov was born in the village of Byvalki in Minsk Governorate (now Loyew District, Gomel Region, Belarus) to a Russian peasant family. He first joined the Red Army in 1919, commanding a platoon. He graduated from the 2nd Moscow Infantry Courses, the 1st Joint Soviet School, and the Frunze Military Academy. He served in the cavalry in Transbaikalia. He transferred to the State Political Directorate in 1932, and in the second half of the 1930s, he commanded a number of border groups in the Far East. In this position, he also served during the Winter War. During the Murmansk Oblast elections of 1939, he was elected Deputy of the Murmansk Regional Council of People's Deputies. He commanded the Murmansk Division Border Service of the NKVD until July 1941, and then formed the 2nd Separate Division of the Special Purpose Troops of the NKVD. From 1941 to 1953. he served as the military commandant of Moscow, in which he organized and supervised the preparation of the Moscow Victory Parade of 1945. After transferring to the reserve from 1953 was in charge of military departments of forestry in Krasnoyarsk, Ryazan and the Moscow agricultural economic and statistical institutes. Sinolov died in Moscow and was buried in the Novodevichy Cemetery.

Date of rank
Kombrig
Major General (4 June 1940)
Lieutenant General (2 November 1944)

Awards 

 Order of Lenin

 4 Orders of the Red Banner
 2 Orders of the Patriotic War, I degree
 Order of the Red Star
 Badge "Honored Worker of the NKVD" 
 Personalized Mauser Pistol)
 Order of the White Lion, 1st degree (Czechoslovakia)
 Czechoslovak War Cross 1939–1945

References 

1902 births
1957 deaths
People from Loyew District
People from Rechitsky Uyezd
Soviet lieutenant generals
Recipients of the Order of Lenin
Recipients of the Order of the Red Banner

NKVD officers